Golden Nugget 64 is a multiplayer virtual casino video game for the Nintendo 64. It was developed by Westwood Studios, published by Electronic Arts, and was released on December 1, 1998 in North America. Golden Nugget 64 is unique because it is the only gambling/casino game released in North America for the Nintendo 64. The game starts off by having the player create an account with $1000 which is saved on the controller pack. Players have the choice from one of ten different popular casino games. Each game has its own set of rules and a guide to learn how to play.

Gameplay
The Golden Nugget Las Vegas hotel and casino is the setting for the following games:
 
Blackjack: The goal of blackjack is to get the total point value of cards to 21 without going over.
Craps: The objective of craps is to bet on the outcome of dice rolls.
Five-card draw: Like most poker games, the point of five card draw is to have the best hand after the final betting round.
Roulette: The goal of roulette is to correctly guess which slot the ball will stop on when the wheel stops spinning.
Seven-card stud: The goal is to have the best hand over other opponents.	
Video poker: The goal of video poker is to make the best possible hand. Unlike other poker games, there are no opponents. The player wins a certain multiplier of the bet based on their hand. Only Jacks or Better video poker are included in this cartridge. 	
Texas hold 'em: Objective is to have a better hand than the opponents.
Big Six wheel: Similar to roulette, this game has players trying to successfully predict what symbol the wheel will stop on.	
Mini-Baccarat: The goal of mini-baccarat is to guess which hand is closer to 9 without going over.	
Slot machines: In order to win in slots, players must match a winning combination of symbols. These symbols vary from slot machine to slot machine. There are six different slot machines in this game (Card Bonanza, Catch of the Day!, Motherlode, Sports Fanatic!, Wheels of Fire!, Miner 49er!).

Other options include a Big Winners list as well as a Slideshow of the actual Golden Nugget Las Vegas hotel and casino.

Audio
The audio in this game is a mixture of "people in the background of the casino, dice rolling, cards flipping, chips stacking, tokens entering slots, the dealer talking to [the player] and a variety of other things". The background music is a laid back piano score while the sound effects all ring true. The male dealer is voiced by Chris Rausch and the female dealer by Donna Rawlins. They have very few standard dealer lines.

Reception 

IGN gave Golden Nugget 64 a 7.8 out of 10 overall praising the gameplay and the graphics despite little criticism about the sound stating "the theme music is nasty".

Other games 
A previous game, Golden Nugget, was released for Microsoft Windows in 1996 and PlayStation in 1997. In 2004, a sequel, Golden Nugget Casino, was released for the Game Boy Advance. Golden Nugget Casino DS was released in 2006 for the Nintendo DS.

References

External links

1998 video games
Nintendo 64 games
Nintendo 64-only games
North America-exclusive video games
Video games developed in the United States
Video games set in the Las Vegas Valley
Video games set in hotels
Casino video games
Westwood Studios games
Digital card games
Video games set in Nevada
Multiplayer and single-player video games